The Code Red Experience was a concert tour by American recording artist Monica, in support of her eighth studio album Code Red (2015). The tour played over 20 shows in the United States. It marks the singer's first headlining tour in 16 years.

Opening acts
Rico Love
XSO 
Atiba 
Michael Blackson 
Shawty-Shawty

Setlist
The following setlist was obtained from the December 6, 2015 show; held at Sound Board in Detroit, Michigan. It does not represent all shows during the tour.
"Video Introduction" 
"The First Night"
"Don't Take It Personal (Just One of Dem Days)"
"So Gone"
"Before You Walk Out of My Life"
"Video Sequence"
"Love Just Ain't Enough"
"Call My Name" 
"I Know"
"Why I Love You So Much"
"Video Sequence"
"For You I Will" / "Believing in Me" / "U Should've Known Better" / "Love All Over Me" / "Angel of Mine" / "Until It's Gone"
"I Miss Music"
"Everything to Me
"Video Sequence" 
"Still Standing"
"Just Right for Me"

Tour dates

Box office score data

References

External links
Official website

2015 concert tours